Syngamia is a genus of moths of the family Crambidae.

Current species
Syngamia albiceps Hampson, 1912
Syngamia binotalis (Warren, 1896)
Syngamia canarialis (Snellen, 1899)
Syngamia convulsa Meyrick, 1936
Syngamia dentilinealis Hampson, 1899
Syngamia eoidalis (C. Felder, R. Felder & Rogenhofer, 1875)
Syngamia eos Druce, 1902
Syngamia euryterminalis Hampson, 1917
Syngamia exigualis (Hübner, 1823)
Syngamia falsidicalis (Walker, 1859)
Syngamia fervidalis (Zeller, 1852)
Syngamia florella (Stoll in Cramer & Stoll, 1781)
Syngamia glebosalis Viette, 1960
Syngamia interrogata Whalley, 1962
Syngamia jeanneli Viette, 1954
Syngamia latifusalis Hampson, 1896
Syngamia latimarginalis (Walker, 1859)
Syngamia liquidalis (Zeller, 1852)
Syngamia luteofusalis (Mabille, 1900)
Syngamia moluccalis (C. Felder, R. Felder & Rogenhofer, 1875)
Syngamia oggalis Swinhoe, 1906
Syngamia violata (Fabricius, 1787)
Syngamia violescentalis Hampson, 1895

Former species
Syngamia aeruginosa Ghesquière, 1940
Syngamia aurantiaca Hampson, 1912
Syngamia longicornalis Mabille, 1900

References

Spilomelinae
Crambidae genera
Taxa named by Achille Guenée